Japanese has one liquid phoneme , realized usually as an apico-alveolar tap  and sometimes as an alveolar lateral approximant . English has two: rhotic  and lateral , with varying phonetic realizations centered on the postalveolar approximant  and on the alveolar lateral approximant , respectively.

Phonetic differences

The Japanese liquid is most often realized as an alveolar tap , though there is some variation depending on phonetic context.  of American English (the dialect Japanese speakers are typically exposed to) is most commonly a postalveolar central approximant with simultaneous secondary pharyngeal constriction  or less commonly a retroflex approximant .   involves contact with the alveolar ridge as well as some raising of the tongue dorsum (velarization), especially when syllable-final.

Perception 

Japanese speakers can, however, perceive the difference between English  and  when these sounds are not mentally processed as speech sounds.  found that Japanese speakers could distinguish  and  just as well as native English speakers if the sounds were acoustically manipulated in a way that made them sound less like speech (by removal of all acoustic information except the F3 component).
 found that speakers' ability to distinguish between the two sounds depended on where the sound occurred. Those that occurred in initial consonant clusters or between vowels were the most difficult to distinguish accurately.

 provide evidence that there is a link between perception and production to the extent that perceptual learning generally transferred to improved production. However, there may be little correlation between degrees of learning in perception and production after training in perception, due to the wide range of individual variation in learning strategies.

Production  

Variations in acquisition

 conducted a longitudinal study that examined the perception and production of English /l/, /r/, and /w/ by adults and children who were native speakers of Japanese but living in the United States. Over time, the children improved more on English /r/ than English /l/.

They suggest that English  is perceived as more similar to Japanese  than English  is, and hence it is harder for Japanese speakers to distinguish Japanese  from English  than Japanese  from English .

Effects of training

 found that monolingual Japanese speakers in Japan could increase their ability to distinguish between /l/ and /r/ after a 3-week training period, which involved hearing minimal pairs (such as 'rock' and 'lock') produced by five speakers, and being asked to identify which word was which. Feedback was provided during training, and participants had to listen to the minimal pairs until the correct answer was given. Participants performed significantly better immediately after the 3-week training, and retained some improvements when retested after 3 months and after 6 months (although there was a decrease in recognition ability at the 6-month test). Reaction time decreased during the training period as the accuracy went up. Participants could "generalize" their learning somewhat: when tested they could distinguish between new /l/ and /r/ minimal pairs, but performed better when the pairs were said by one of the five speakers they had heard before rather than by a new speaker.

 argue that it is possible to train Japanese adults to distinguish speech sounds they find difficult to differentiate at first. They found that speech training results in outcomes indicating a real change in the perception of the sounds as speech, rather than simply in auditory perception.

Examples
For their study,  used the following ones:
right/light
red/led
road/load
arrive/alive
correct/collect
crime/climb
bread/bled
froze/flows

So store and stole or stall, for example, are distinguished as sutoa and sutōru, respectively.

See also 
 English phonology
 Engrish
 Lallation (disambiguation)
 Non-native pronunciations of English
 Rhotacism and lambdacism

References

Bibliography

English language
Japanese language
Japanese phonology
Phonology
Language acquisition
Language comparison
Rhotic consonants
Shibboleths
English as a second or foreign language